Friendship is an unincorporated community and census-designated place (CDP) in Anne Arundel County, Maryland, United States. As of the 2010 census, its population was 447.

Demographics

References

External links
 
 Friendship at archINFORM

Census-designated places in Maryland
Census-designated places in Anne Arundel County, Maryland